Lakehead University is a public research university with campuses in Thunder Bay and Orillia, Ontario, Canada. Lakehead University, shortened to 'Lakehead U', is non-denominational and provincially supported. It has undergraduate programs, graduate programs, the Bora Laskin Faculty of Law, the only internationally accredited (AACSB) business school in northern Ontario, and is home to the western campus of the Northern Ontario School of Medicine.

Lakehead has more than 45,000 alumni. The main campus in Thunder Bay has about 7,900 students.

History

Lakehead University evolved from Lakehead Technical Institute and Lakehead College of Arts, Science, and Technology.
 Lakehead Technical Institute was established in response to a brief that outlined the need for an institution of higher education in northwestern Ontario. It was established on June 4, 1946, by an Order-in-Council of the Province of Ontario. Classes commenced in January 1948, in temporary rented quarters in downtown Port Arthur. In September of that same year, the first university courses were added to the curriculum.

Lakehead College of Arts, Science and Technology was established by an Act of the Ontario Legislature, proclaimed on August 1, 1957. Years later, the original Lakehead College of Arts, Science and Technology Act was amended to grant the college authority to establish new faculties, and confer degrees in arts and sciences.

The Lakehead University Act was given royal assent on June 22, 1965, and came into force on July 1, 1965. The Lakehead College of Arts, Science and Technology, thereafter known as "Lakehead University," was continued under this new charter. The first degrees were conferred on May 5, 1965. The first university chancellor was Senator Norman McLeod Paterson.

Campuses

Thunder Bay campus

The original college site comprised about 32 hectares of land in south-west Port Arthur, Ontario. From 1962 to 1965, an additional 87 hectares of adjoining land was purchased in anticipation of future expansion. The first building was opened in 1957.

In 2005 the Northern Ontario School of Medicine (NOSM) was formed as a joint initiative between Lakehead University and Laurentian University in Sudbury organized within the Faculty of Medicine of both Laurentian (East Campus) and Lakehead (West Campus) universities. The medical school has multiple teaching and research sites across Northern Ontario, including large and small communities. Students are given a choice of attending either one of the two main NOSM campuses. NOSM is the only Canadian medical school to be established as a stand-alone not-for-profit corporation, with its own Board of Directors and corporation bylaws.

A new law school was established; the faculty accepted its first students in 2013. The program is housed in the former Port Arthur Collegiate Institute.  In 2014 it was named the Bora Laskin Faculty of Law, after the fourteenth Chief Justice of Canada.

Lakehead University's physical plant now consists of 39 buildings and 116 hectares of property including 40 hectares of landscaped and maintained grounds.

Orillia campus

Lakehead University opened a campus at Heritage Place in Downtown Orillia in 2006; during the first semester there were about 100 students.

In September 2010 the university expanded to its new 500 University Avenue location. A new academic building at this site represents the first phase in the development of Canada's first Leadership in Energy and Environmental Design (LEED) Platinum university campus.  A 271-bed student residence building and a cafeteria/bookstore facility opened in November 2012 at the University Avenue site.  Lakehead Orillia now has over 1,200 students studying at the Heritage Place and University Avenue sites. Undergraduate programs are offered at the 500 University Avenue site, while the professional year of Lakehead Orillia's education programs are offered at the downtown campus.

Residence
Accommodations at Lakehead are divided into three living styles: residence halls, apartments and townhouses. The Thunder Bay residence currently has a total of 1,196 beds and three cafeteria/dining halls. Students can choose from meal options that range from kitchenette, full-kitchen and complete meal plan depending on the residence styles.

The men's residence for 52 students was opened in fall of 1962, and has grown to include a residence village consisting of 10 new buildings. The village is situated on the banks of the McIntyre River within  five-minute walking distance of all university buildings and athletic facilities.

From 1989 to 1992, a complex of townhouses, including some handicap accessible units, was added to the residence facility.

A 271-bed residence in Orillia opened its doors in late Fall 2012. The Orillia residence has two meal plan options for students, as well as one cafeteria, owned by Madison County.

Agricultural Research Station
The university supports a research station near Thunder Bay to test newly developed crop varieties. The station had been in operation for a number of years, and was officially taken over by the university in 2018.

Academic organization

The university has nine faculties: Business Administration, Education, Engineering, Natural Resources Management, Faculty of Health and Behavioral Sciences, Science and Environmental Studies, Social Sciences and Humanities, Medicine, and Graduate Studies. The Faculty of Law welcomed its first students in September 2013.

Based on full-time undergraduate enrolment, the Social Sciences & Humanities is the largest faculty at Lakehead, with about 30% of the students, followed by Health and Behavioral Sciences, Science & Environmental Studies, Engineering, Education, and Business Administration. Two small faculties are Natural Resources Management and Medicine, each with less than 2% of the student enrolment.

Aboriginal

As a percentage of total student population, Lakehead University has one of the largest aboriginal student communities in Canada. The university has a governing board with senate policies along with Aboriginal-governed councils within its university governance structure. Lakehead also offers Aboriginal support including the Office of Aboriginal Initiatives. Special first-year bridging programs for Aboriginal students are provided. Tutoring services are available within Lakehead's Native Nursing Access Program. There is also the Superior Science Program which goes to remote Aboriginal communities. Lakehead has Canada's only Department of Aboriginal Education to foster Native Language instruction and prepare teachers to meet the needs of Aboriginal students and communities.

Scholarships and bursaries
Lakehead University scholarships for Aboriginal, First Nations and Métis students include: Hamlin Family Fund Nursing Bursaries; Hamlin Family Fund Bursary; Hamlin Family Fund Native Bursary; Lakehead University Native Award; TBayTel Bursary 

Apart from these awards, Lakehead University provides entrance scholarships to high school students with marks above 80%, paid out during four years of undergraduate. Lakehead also offers free tuition to students with a 95% average or higher.

Student life

Lakehead University Student Union, or LUSU, serves as a governing body for student-run clubs. Students can participate in various club activities, ranging from student government to multi-cultural and athletics. LUSU is also responsible for publishing The Argus, the student newspaper, as well as running The Study Coffeehouse and The Outpost Pub, sites that often serve as gathering places for campus community activities and as performance venues.

Athletics
Lakehead's Thunder Bay campus has two main athletic facilities known as the Fieldhouse and the Hangar. The Fieldhouse contains a main gymnasium, weight room, yoga room, 50-meter swimming pool and change-room facilities. The Hangar has a 200-meter indoor track, soccer field, cardio area, aerobic studio and a climbing wall. Lakehead University is represented in the Canadian Interuniversity Sport league by the Lakehead Thunderwolves. Varsity teams include: Basketball, Cross-Country, Hockey, Nordic Skiing, Track & Field, Volleyball, and Wrestling. It also has club teams including, Men's Volleyball, men's and women's curling, and rowing.

Notable faculty
 Andrew Donald Booth, early computer scientist, President of Lakehead University from 1972 to 1978 
 Kathleen Booth, early computer scientist, inventor of the first computer assembly language
 Christopher Mushquash, Canada Research Chair in Indigenous Mental Health and Addiction
 Dave Siciliano, athletic director and coach of Lakehead Nor'Westers men's ice hockey from 1975 to 1980

Notable alumni

Shandor Alphonso - NHL Official
 Steve Ashton – Minister of Water Stewardship / MLA Thompson, Government of Manitoba
 Jan Cameron, Australian swimmer and coach
 Melissa Coates - Professional Wrestler
 Ronald J. Duhamel – former Member of Parliament, Senator
 Jim Foulds – former Ontario MPP
Patty Hajdu - Member of Parliament, Thunder Bay - Superior North; and Minister
 Bruce Hyer – former Member of Parliament, Thunder Bay - Superior North
Anthony LeBlanc - Sports executive, former president, CEO, and alternate governor of the Arizona Coyotes, former vice president of global sales for BlackBerry 
 Stephen Low – IMAX Film maker, Director
Kathleen Lynch - President, Confederation College
Eric Melillo - Canadian MP, Kenora Riding, who was elected at the age of 21, in 2019, immediately after finishing his BA.
Dusty Miller, OOnt - politician and first female mayor of the City of Thunder Bay.
Lyn McLeod, OOnt – Canadian Politician, former leader of the Ontario Liberal Party, former provincial Cabinet Minister (multiple portfolios)
Roy Piovesana - archivist, historian, musician, teacher
 Gary Polonsky – Founding President and Vice-Chancellor, University of Ontario Institute of Technology
 Michael Rapino – Live Nation Entertainment – CEO (parent company of Ticketmaster)
 Diane Schoemperlen – novelist
David Shannon, CM, OOnt - Canadian disability/human rights activist, lawyer, politician, actor, university lecturer, author, and adventurer
 Dave Siciliano, ice hockey coach and player
 Jamie Sokalsky – President and CEO Barrick Gold
 Don Talbot - Australian swimming coach
 Denis Turcotte – President & CEO, Algoma Steel
 Dr. Asmia Vezina - President, Algoma University

See also

List of Ontario Universities
Ontario Student Assistance Program
Higher education in Ontario
Canadian Interuniversity Sport
Canadian government scientific research organizations
Canadian university scientific research organizations
Canadian industrial research and development organizations

References

Further reading
Harold S. Braun with William G. Tamblyn. 'A Northern Vision: The Development of Lakehead University.' Thunder Bay: Lakehead University, President's Office, 1987.

External links

Lakehead University Official Site
Lakehead University – Orillia Campus Official Site
Lakehead Thunderwolves Official Site

 
Educational institutions established in 1965
Forestry education
Buildings and structures in Orillia
Buildings and structures in Thunder Bay
1965 establishments in Ontario
1965 establishments in Canada
Universities in Ontario